30th Anniversary Collection may refer to:

 30th Anniversary Collection (Whitesnake album)
 30th Anniversary Collection (Paul Anka album)